The second season of the Sgt. Frog anime series consists of the fifty-two episodes after episode fifty-one from the series, which first aired in Japan from April 1, 2005, to March 31, 2006, on TV Tokyo. Season 2 uses two opening themes and two ending themes.  by GaGaGa SP is used as the opening from episode 52 to 78.  by Group Tamashi is used as the opening from episode 79 to 103.  by Naoya Ogawa & Mayuko Iwasa is used as the ending from episode 52 to 78.  by toutou is used as the ending from episode 79 to 103.

This season of Sgt. Frog was released to Region 1 DVD in North America beginning with the first boxset containing episodes 52–65, on July 26, 2011, by Funimation Entertainment as Season 3 Vol. 1. Season 3 Vol. 2 was released to DVD on August 16, 2011, containing episodes 66–78. Funimation has not yet made any plans to release episodes 79 to 103 on DVD as Season 4.


Episode list

References

External links
  2nd season episodes
  Keroro Gunsō schedule - Sunrise

2005 Japanese television seasons
2006 Japanese television seasons
Season 2